Keith Jackson Zinger (born October 9, 1984) is a former American football tight end. He was drafted by the Atlanta Falcons in the seventh round of the 2008 NFL Draft. He played college football at Louisiana State. He was a member of both LSU’s national championship teams in 2003 and 2007.

Early years
Zinger attended to Leesville High School and was ranked as the nation’s No. 13 tight end in the country by Rivals.com. He also was named an Atlanta Journal-Constitution Super Southern 100, Baton Rouge Advocate Second Dozen and the New Orleans Times-Picayune Top 25 Blue-Chip list. Zinger also was a first-team 4A all-state selection and in his senior season, he had 322 yards on 23 receptions for two touchdowns.

College career
Zinger played in 13 games in his freshman season at LSU, caught three passes for 31 yards and was named Freshmen All-SEC squad by the league's coaches. He was member of the team that won the BCS National Championship in the 2004 Sugar Bowl, by beating the Oklahoma Sooners 21-14.

In 2005, Zinger scored his first career touchdown on a nine-yard reception from JaMarcus Russell in a game against Appalachian State.
In 2007, during his senior season, he played in 14 games and caught three passes for 51 yards averaging 17.0) and a long reception of 27 yards. He also had a career-long 27-yard reception against the Tennessee Volunteers in the 2007 SEC Championship Game. to help the tigers reach the 2008 BCS National Championship Game to defeat the Ohio State Buckeyes.

Professional career

Atlanta Falcons
Zinger was drafted by the Atlanta Falcons in the seventh round of the 2008 NFL Draft (232 overall) and signed to a four-year contract. He was released on the final cuts but was added to the practice squad  and spent the entire season there.

New York Jets
Zinger was signed by the New York Jets on August 7, 2011. He was waived September 2.

Family
He is son of Randy and Michele Zinger. He is married to the former Ashley McKenzie. He has four siblings; Clinton, Gareth, Priscilla, and Biancia.

References

External links

LSU Tigers bio
Atlanta Falcons bio

1984 births
Living people
People from Leesville, Louisiana
German players of American football
American football tight ends
LSU Tigers football players
Atlanta Falcons players
Sportspeople from Heidelberg